Putri Bidadari (English:Angelic Princess) is an Indonesian long-running soap opera with full-episode. It was produced by SinemArt Productions and network by RCTI and starred character such as Qheyla Zavyera Valendro, Sandra Dewi and Atalarik Syah.

Cast

Plot 
Putri is a beautiful, sweet girl, who is mature for her age. My daughter lives with her father Mahmud, his mother, Sari, and grandmother Grandma Ida. One day, Mahmud led to a fire in the house of her employer, Jeffery, which causes Jeffery family, Dini, his wife, and Baby children died. Jeffry also seek to hold accountable Mahmud.

Mahmud who fear had left his family when Jeffry came. Jeffry then intend to take the daughter. But fortunately Sari and daughter managed to escape from the pursuing Jeffery to run into the woods. But an accident claimed the lives of Sari in the forest, so the daughter had to live alone with Grandma Ida. Before he died, Sari had to say farewell to the princess with great affection. Sari asked daughter not to be sad and always spread love to everyone. Sari was last tears. Miraculously, tears Sari was transformed into a beautiful crystal and shimmering. Apparently, the amount of affection for daughter Sari has touched the hearts of Angels. Angel came down to earth to protect the Putri through tears Sari, the transformed into a crystal. Jeffry had turned out to see it in disbelief. Jeffry was making plans to seize it from the Crystal Putri, to bring back his family who have died.

Originally daughter did not notice a change in him. He was just surprised to find a beautiful crystal in her bag. Putri had remembered the tales that often read Sari at night before sleeping Putri. But Grandma Ida reminded that it is only fiction. But when the second angel saved him again from venomous snake bites, the Putri was willing to not want to believe. Putri was glad of the presence of angels at his side and help him. He also summoned the angel by the name Bundadari. After that, it was always Putri Crystal store in the bag.

Putri was then undergo adventures with the help of Angels. Daughter with love and innocence also helped a lot of friends, neighbors in the village to solve the problems of their lives.

Concern grew when Mahmud's daughter secretly returned and complicate Grandma Ida and daughter. Angel was still faithful to help Putri resolve any problem.

International broadcasts

Award

External links 
 SinemArt
 RCTI Website
 Putri Bidadari in Youtube Search

Indonesian television soap operas
RCTI original programming
2012 Indonesian television series debuts
2013 Indonesian television series endings